This is a list of wars involving the Republic of Turkey and includes conflicts such as coups, insurgencies, offensives, border and international disputes since the Turkish War of Independence in 1919. For wars before 1919, involving the Ottoman Empire, see List of wars involving the Ottoman Empire

Wars

Coups and coup attempts in Turkey
There have been 2 successful coups in Turkey:
1960 coup d'état
1962 coup d'état attempt
1963 coup d'état attempt
1969 coup d'état attempt
1971 coup d'état attempt
1971 military memorandum
1979 military memorandum
1980 coup d'état
1997 military memorandum
2007 military memorandum
2016 coup d'état attempt

Insurgency in Turkey
There are several insurgency in Turkey, including the following: 
 Kurdish insurgency in Turkey - 1st and 2nd Phase and Kurdish insurgency in Turkey - 3rd Phase
 Maoist insurgency in Turkey
 Marxist–Leninist DHKP/C insurgency in Turkey
 Terrorism in Turkey

Wars and battles during the War of Independence

Turkish-Armenian War
 Turkish–Armenian War
 Battle of Oltu
 Battle of Sarikamish (1920)
 Battle of Kars (1920)
 Battle of Alexandropol

Franco-Turkish War
 Franco-Turkish War
 Karboğazı ambush
 Battle of Marash
 Battle of Urfa
Battle of Kovanbaşı
 Siege of Aintab
 Akbaş arms depot raid

Greco-Turkish War
 Greco-Turkish War (1919–1922)
 Greek landing at Smyrna
 Urla Clashes
 Malgaç Raid
 Battle of Bergama
 Raid on Erbeyli
 Raid on Erikli
 Battle of Tellidede
 Battle of Aydın
 Greek Summer Offensive (1920)
 Battle of the Gediz
 First Battle of İnönü
 Second Battle of İnönü
 Battle of Kütahya–Eskişehir
 Battle of Sakarya
 Great Offensive
 Battle of Dumlupınar
 Turkish capture of Smyrna
 Fire of Smyrna

Occupations
 Occupation of Smyrna
 Occupation of Constantinople

Revolts
 Revolt of Ahmet Anzavur 1919-1920
 Konya rebellion 1920
 Koçgiri Rebellion 1921
 Beytussebab rebellion 1923
 Sheikh Said rebellion 1925
 Ararat rebellion 1927-1930
 Menemen Uprising 1930
 Dersim Rebellion 1937-1938

Other conflicts and crises involving Turkey
 Chanak Crisis 1922
 Turkey during World War II 1945
 Turkish Straits crisis 1946-1947
 Cuban Missile Crisis 1962
 Greece-Turkey Imia/Kardak conflict, 1996
 2017 Iraqi–Kurdish conflict
 Aegean dispute
 2020 Nagorno-Karabakh war

Turkish involvement in the Syrian Civil War
 Turkish involvement in the Syrian Civil War 2012-present
 Syrian government-Turkish border clashes 2012-2014
 Operation Shah Euphrates
 Operation Euphrates Shield
 Turkey–ISIL conflict
 Northern al-Bab offensive (September 2016)
 2016 Dabiq offensive
 Battle of al-Bab
 Turkish military operation in Idlib Governorate
 Operation Olive Branch
 Operation Peace Spring
 Second Battle of Ras al-Ayn

See also
 Military history of Turkey
 List of wars involving the Ottoman Empire
 List of battles involving the Ottoman Empire
 Military history of the Ottoman Empire

Notes

References

 
Turkey
Wars
Wars